Syntaxin-4 is a protein that in humans is encoded by the STX4 gene.

Interactions 

STX4 has been shown to interact with:

 Gelsolin,
 NAPA, 
 RAB4A, 
 SNAP-25, 
 SNAP23, 
 STXBP1, 
 STXBP5, 
 Syntaxin binding protein 3,
 TXLNB, 
 VAMP2, 
 VAMP3,  and
 Vesicle-associated membrane protein 8.

References

Further reading

External links